Marine chemistry, also known as ocean chemistry or chemical oceanography, is influenced by plate tectonics and seafloor spreading, turbidity currents, sediments, pH levels, atmospheric constituents, metamorphic activity, and ecology. The field of chemical oceanography studies the chemistry of marine environments including the influences of different variables. Marine life has adapted to the chemistries unique to earth's oceans, and marine ecosystems are sensitive to changes in ocean chemistry.

The impact of human activity on the chemistry of the earth's oceans has increased over time, with pollution from industry and various land-use practices significantly affecting the oceans. Moreover, increasing levels of carbon dioxide in the earth's atmosphere have led to ocean acidification, which has negative effects on marine ecosystems. The international community has agreed that restoring the chemistry of the oceans is a priority, and efforts toward this goal are tracked as part of Sustainable Development Goal 14.

Chemical oceanography is the study of the chemistry of Earth's oceans. An interdisciplinary field, chemical oceanographers study the distributions and reactions of both naturally occurring and anthropogenic chemicals from molecular to global scales.

Due to the interrelatedness of the ocean, chemical oceanographers frequently work on problems relevant to physical oceanography, geology and geochemistry, biology and biochemistry, and atmospheric science. Many chemical oceanographers investigate biogeochemical cycles, and the marine carbon cycle in particular attracts significant interest due to its role in carbon sequestration and ocean acidification. Other major topics of interest include analytical chemistry of the oceans, marine pollution, and anthropogenic climate change.

Organic compounds in the oceans
Colored dissolved organic matter (CDOM) is estimated to range 20-70% of carbon content of the oceans, being higher near river outlets and lower in the open ocean.

Marine life is largely similar in biochemistry to terrestrial organisms, except that they inhabit a saline environment.  One consequence of their adaptation is that marine organisms are the most prolific source of halogenated organic compounds.

Chemical ecology of extremophiles

The ocean provides special marine environments inhabited by extremophiles that thrive under unusual conditions of temperature, pressure, and darkness.  Such environments include hydrothermal vents and black smokers and cold seeps on the ocean floor, with entire ecosystems of organisms that have a symbiotic relationship with compounds that provide energy through a process called chemosynthesis.

Plate tectonics

Seafloor spreading on mid-ocean ridges is a global scale ion-exchange system. Hydrothermal vents at spreading centers introduce various amounts of iron, sulfur, manganese, silicon and other elements into the ocean, some of which are recycled into the ocean crust. Helium-3, an isotope that accompanies volcanism from the mantle, is emitted by hydrothermal vents and can be detected in plumes within the ocean.

Spreading rates on mid-ocean ridges vary between 10 and 200 mm/yr. Rapid spreading rates cause increased basalt reactions with seawater. The magnesium/calcium ratio will be lower because more magnesium ions are being removed from seawater and consumed by the rock, and more calcium ions are being removed from the rock and released to seawater. Hydrothermal activity at ridge crest is efficient in removing magnesium. A lower Mg/Ca ratio favors the precipitation of low-Mg calcite polymorphs of calcium carbonate (calcite seas).

Slow spreading at mid-ocean ridges has the opposite effect and will result in a higher Mg/Ca ratio favoring the precipitation of aragonite and high-Mg calcite polymorphs of calcium carbonate (aragonite seas).

Experiments show that most modern high-Mg calcite organisms would have been low-Mg calcite in past calcite seas, meaning that the Mg/Ca ratio in an organism's skeleton varies with the Mg/Ca ratio of the seawater in which it was grown.

The mineralogy of reef-building and sediment-producing organisms is thus regulated by chemical reactions occurring along the mid-ocean ridge, the rate of which is controlled by the rate of sea-floor spreading.

Human impacts

Marine pollution

Climate change

Increased carbon dioxide levels, mostly from burning fossil fuels, are changing ocean chemistry.   Global warming and changes in salinity have significant implications for the ecology of marine environments.

Acidification

Deoxygenation

History 

Early inquiries into marine chemistry usually concerned the origin of salinity in the ocean, including work by Robert Boyle. Modern chemical oceanography began as a field with the 1872–1876 Challenger expedition, which made the first systematic measurements of ocean chemistry.

Tools 
Chemical oceanographers collect and measure chemicals in seawater, using the standard toolset of analytical chemistry as well as instruments like pH meters, electrical conductivity meters, fluorometers, and dissolved CO₂ meters. Most data are collected through shipboard measurements and from autonomous floats or buoys, but remote sensing is used as well. On an oceanographic research vessel, a CTD is used to measure electrical conductivity, temperature, and pressure, and is often mounted on a rosette of Nansen bottles to collect seawater for analysis. Sediments are commonly studied with a box corer or a sediment trap, and older sediments may be recovered by scientific drilling.

Marine chemistry on other planets and their moons
The chemistry of the subsurface ocean of Europa may be Earthlike. The subsurface ocean of Enceladus vents hydrogen and carbon dioxide to space.

See also 

 Global Ocean Data Analysis Project
 Oceanography
 Physical oceanography
 World Ocean Atlas
 Seawater
 RISE project

References

Chemical oceanography
Oceanographical terminology
Geochemistry